The Brooklyn Excelsiors were an amateur baseball team that played in Brooklyn, New York. Formed in 1854, the Excelsior ballclub featured stars such as Jim Creighton, Asa Brainard, and Candy Cummings.

The team is known for originating the "Brooklyn-style" baseball cap, precursor to the modern cap. They also were one of the first baseball clubs to undertake a long-distance tour to compete outside their home region.

1860 Championship Season

In 1860, the Excelsior club made a now-famous tour around New York and large cities in surrounding states. They defeated the Champion Club of Albany, the Victory Club of Troy, the Buffalo Niagaras, and the powerful Brooklyn Atlantics. Besides establishing the tradition of ball clubs traveling long distances to compete with other clubs, the tour helped advance the game's popularity outside the New York region.

In 1860 the Excelsiors compiled a record of 19 wins and two losses, and were champions of the National Association, finishing in a draw with the Brooklyn Atlantics Club. However, the Atlantics were the accepted champions.

During the 1860 season, the Excelsiors began wearing an ancestor of the modern, snug-fitting baseball cap, including a long visor and button top. The cap, which became popular by the 1900s, was known as "Brooklyn-style", and was the predominant baseball cap until the 1940s.

References

External links
19th Century Baseball Champions 1860–1869

Defunct baseball teams in New York City
1854 establishments in New York (state)
Sports in Brooklyn
Baseball teams established in 1854
National Association of Base Ball Players teams
Amateur baseball teams in New York (state)
Defunct baseball teams in New York (state)
Baseball teams disestablished in 1870
1870 disestablishments in New York (state)